Motorsport.com is a website specializing in motor racing news. It posts content in thirteen languages. It is part of the Motorsport Network company. Motorsport.com's headquarters are in Miami, United States.

History
Motorsport.com was formed in 1994.

In March 2015, Motorsport.com acquired ToileF1.com., followed by Worldcarfans.com and Edimotive S.r.l. in May. In May, the Grand Prix Drivers' Association and Motorsport.com joined forces to allow followers of the FIA Formula 1 World Championship to voice and share their opinions about the sport through an extensive worldwide survey for fans. More than 200,000 respondents from 194 countries participated in the survey. In June, Motorsport.com acquired TotalRace.com.br, RaceFansTV and Formulawahad.com, while later gaining the technical archive of Giorgio Piola in September, also announcing a partnership with MSN.com. In October, Motorsport.com became the official media partner of Ferrari for the 2016 Ferrari Finali Mondiali and a global partner of GPTicketShop.com. In November, Motorsport.com acquired Wildsoft Digital F1 Encyclopedia. The following month, the site formed a global digital content partnership with VICE Sports and AOL’s Autoblog.com.

In 2016 Motorsport.com acquired French pan-european TV-station Motors TV after it went into a bankruptcy procedure. In 2018 the renamed Motorsport.TV decided to stop broadcasting as a television station  and closed down the television operation.

In January 2016, Motorsport.com appointed Zak Brown as non-executive chairman of Motorsport.com In February, the site announced a strategic merchandising partnership with UK-based Branded-London and Puma Company. In March 2016, Motorsport.com became the official digital media partner of the FIA World Endurance Championship, while also extending exclusive digital rights agreement to host the F1 video magazine Series Inside Grand Prix. On 15 March 2016, Motorsport.com acquired Spain’s moto racing digital media company Motocuatro.com. In April 2016, Motorsport.com acquired TurkiyeF1.com, Turkish auto racing website. In May 2016 Motorsport.com acquired gp-live.hu. In June 2016 Motorsport.com acquired F1-Ukraine.com.ua. The following month, the site become official media partner” of the 2016 TCR International Series. In March 2017, Motorsport.com launched a tri-language Swiss edition in partnership with businessman Lorenzo Senna.

In 2016, Motorsport.com expanded to Japan through a joint venture with digital media company, Kotsu Times Sha Co.

Staff writers

Its current editor-in-chief is Charles Bradley, having been appointed to the position of global editorial leader in May 2015.
The team's current roster of leading staff journalists includes Formula 1 Editor Jonathan Noble, MotoGP Editor Oriol Puigdemont, European News Editor Pablo Elizalde, Swiss News Motorsport Italian Edition Antonio Russo, Swiss News Motorsport German Edition, Swiss News Motorsport French Edition, US Editor David Malsher, News Manager Nick DeGroot, NASCAR Editors Lee Spencer and Jim Utter, French Editor Guillaume Navarro, Italian Editor Franco Nugnes, Swiss German, Swiss French and Swiss Italian Editor Gabriele Testi from July 2016 till August 2019 and Emmanuel Rolland from September 2019 till July 2020 Editor Australian Editor Andrew van Leeuwen, UK Editor Jamie Klein, Russian Editor Manu Chapodze, Brazilian Editor Felipe Motta, German Editor Stefan Ziegler, Latin-American Editor Jose Roman, Middle East Editor Khodr Rawi, Indian Editor Rachit Thukral, Canadian Editor René Fagnan, Japanese Editor Kunihiko Akai, Turkish Director Cihangir Perperik, Editor in Chief Kemal Şengül, Head of Digital Abdullah Çelik and Head of Social İnci Beğen.

Awards
 Motorsport.com received Silver Telly Award by Telly Awards.

References

NASCAR mass media
NASCAR websites